Woo Joo-Sung (born 8 June 1993) is a South Korean footballer who plays as centre back for Gyeongnam FC.

Career
He signed with Gyeongnam FC before 2014 season.

References

External links 

1993 births
Living people
Association football defenders
South Korean footballers
Gyeongnam FC players
Gimcheon Sangmu FC players
K League 1 players
K League 2 players
Sportspeople from Busan